The ATA Carnet, often referred to as the "Passport for goods", is an international customs document that permits the tax-free and duty-free temporary export and import of nonperishable goods for up to one year. It consists of unified customs declaration forms which are prepared ready to use at every border crossing point. It is a globally accepted guarantee for customs duties and taxes which can replace the security deposit required by each customs authority. It can be used in multiple countries in multiple trips up to its one-year validity. The acronym ATA is a combination of French and English terms "Admission Temporaire/Temporary Admission". The ATA carnet is now the document most widely used by the business community for international operations involving temporary admission of goods.

The ATA Carnet is jointly administered by the World Customs Organization (WCO) and the International Chamber of Commerce (ICC) through its World Chambers Federation.

History

Background 

Early suggestions for an international temporary admission scheme were made during the 1900 and 1913 Congresses on Customs regulations, which were examined by Customs experts convened in 1923 under the auspices of the League of Nations but no positive result was achieved. In 1952, based on the recommendations already put forward in the ICCs' report on "Invisible Barriers to Trade and Travel" from 1949, the contracting parties to GATT adopted an International Convention to Facilitate the Importation of Commercial Samples and Advertising Material proposed and drafted by the International Chamber of Commerce and which entered into force on 20 November 1955. During the meetings of the Seventh Session Working Party, which prepared the text of the convention, and following a proposal by the French delegation, some consideration was given to the possibility of introducing a system of triptyques or carnets for samples of value carried by commercial travellers. It was suggested that such a system would alleviate the financial burdens and administrative formalities imposed upon firms sending representatives abroad. The Working Party was informed that a scheme for duty-free admission of commercial travellers' samples under cover of a customs triptyque had been worked out for operation on a bilateral basis between Austria and Switzerland though it had not yet been put into force. On 1 March 1954, the Austrian Government informed the Executive Secretary of GATT that on 1 February 1954 the scheme for the duty-free admission of commercial travellers' samples was put into effect by the Customs Administrations of Austria and Switzerland. In accordance with this agreement commercial travellers and agents were permitted to import commercial samples from Switzerland into Austria, and conversely, temporarily duty-free under cover of a commercial sample triptyque without the deposit of import duties. The guarantees for the import duties are given by an Austrian insurance company for imports into Austria, and by a Swiss company for the imports into Switzerland. The application of this system was limited to collections of samples on which the customs duties would not exceed 60,000 Austrian schillings or 10,000 Swiss Francs. The period allowed for re-exportation was one year.

Thus, based on this convention, this triptyque scheme and allegedly following Charles Aubert's vision and initiative (director of the Chamber of Commerce, Industry and Services of Geneva and future first director of the Chambres de Commerce Suisses),  the Customs Co-operation Council with the cooperation of the International League of Commercial Travellers and Agents and of the ICC's International Information Bureau of Chambers of Commerce prepared the Customs Convention Regarding the E.C.S. Carnets for Commercial Samples which entered into force on 3 October 1957. The new Convention introduced the E.C.S. Carnet, a substitution on an optional basis for the usual national temporary importation papers which replaced any deposit or guarantee for suspended import duties and charges if such a guarantee was required by the customs authorities in a particular case. The initials E.C.S. stand for the combined English and French words: Echantillons Commerciaux - Commercial Samples. The first countries to sign this convention were West Germany, Austria, Belgium, Denmark, France, United Kingdom, Republic of Ireland, Italy, Luxembourg, Norway, Netherlands, Portugal, Sweden, Switzerland and Turkey and the Belgian Ministry of Foreign Affairs acted as the depositary of the convention. The Customs Co-operation Council informed the Executive Secretary of GATT that the "satisfactory results obtained by the use of E.C.S. carnets for the temporary importation of commercial samples (in 1960, 15,600 ECS carnets were issued, for a total value of US$16,320,000) has induced the international trading community to propose that the facilities offered by the ECS Carnet Convention should be extended over the widest possible field." This idea was supported by the International Chamber of Commerce.

The ATA Convention 

A preliminary enquiry on the usefulness of a customs document for temporary duty-free admission, carried out by the Customs Cooperation Council with the assistance of GATT, UNESCO and ICC showed general support for the preparation of a document on the lines of the ECS carnet, which could be used to facilitate, in particular, the temporary admission of professional equipment and of goods for display or use at exhibitions, fairs, etc. Since two Conventions concerning the temporary admission of these items were in the course of preparation, it was recognised that it would be highly desirable that the Convention creating the new document should be ready for adoption by the council, at the same time as these Conventions; or as soon as possible thereafter. Hence, due to the ECS Carnet success, in 1961 the Customs Cooperation Council adopted the Customs Convention on the ATA Carnet for the Temporary Admission of Goods (ATA Convention) which then entered into force on 30 July 1963. ATA Carnets are seen as upgraded version of ECS Carnets, which are no longer limited to commercial samples. More specific conventions for each type of applicable good were subsequently worked out and agreed on by the CCC. At its 47th / 48th Sessions (June 1976), the Council recommended Contracting Parties to the Customs Convention Regarding the E.C.S. Carnets for Commercial Samples to denounce it as it duplicates the ATA Convention. To date, 21 countries have deposited their instruments of denunciation of the ECS Convention which, as a result, now has only one Contracting Party (Haiti)."The States signatory to this Convention, convinced that the adoption of common procedures for the temporary duty-free importation of goods would afford considerable advantages to international commercial and cultural activities and would secure a higher degree of harmony and uniformity in the customs system of the Contracting Parties." – (Preamble of the A.T.A. Convention)

The Istanbul Convention 

Between 1950 and 1970, there was a proliferation in the number of international Conventions, Recommendations, Agreements and other instruments on temporary admission, creating confusion for the international business community and complicating the work of Customs. In the early 1990s the WCO decided to take draft a worldwide Convention on temporary admission to combine, into a single international instrument, 13 existing temporary admission agreements, namely:

 Customs Convention on the ATA carnet for the temporary admission of goods (ATA Convention), Brussels, 6 December 1961
 Customs Convention concerning facilities for the importation of goods for display or use at exhibitions, fairs, meetings or similar events, Brussels, 8 June 1961
 Customs Convention on the temporary importation of professional equipment, Brussels, 8 June 1961
 European Convention on Customs treatment of pallets used in international transport, Geneva, 9 December 1960
 Customs Convention on the temporary importation of packings, Brussels, 6 October 1960
 Articles 2 to 11 and Annexes 1 (paragraphs 1 and 2) to 3 to the Customs Convention on Containers, Geneva, 2 December 1972
 Articles 3, 5 and 6 (1.b and 2) of the International Convention to facilitate the importation of commercial samples and advertising material, Geneva, 7 November 1952
 Customs Convention on welfare material for seafarers, Brussels, 1 December 1964
 Customs Convention on the temporary importation of scientific equipment, Brussels, 11 June 1968
 Customs Convention on the temporary importation of pedagogic material, Brussels, 8 June 1970
 Articles 2 and 5 of the Convention concerning Customs facilities for touring, New York, 4 June 1954
 Additional Protocol to the Convention concerning Customs facilities for touring, relating to the importation of tourist publicity documents and material, New York, 4 June 1954
 Customs Convention on the temporary importation of private road vehicles, New York, 4 June 1954
 Customs Convention on the temporary importation of commercial road vehicles, Geneva, 18 May 1956
 Customs Convention on the temporary importation for private use of aircraft and pleasure boats, Geneva, 18 May 1956

Hence, in order to simplify and harmonize temporary admission formalities provided in various Conventions, the Convention on Temporary Admission, i.e. Istanbul Convention, was adopted at WCO on 26 June 1990 and then entered into force on 27 November 1993. Its objectives and principles are:

 To devise a single instrument for the simplification and harmonization of temporary admission formalities, replacing all the existing Conventions or Recommendations dealing solely or principally with temporary admission. The subjects covered by the former Conventions are now covered by the Annexes to the Istanbul Convention.
 Each Annex authorizes the temporary admission of goods imported for a specific purpose, e.g. Annex B.1. covers goods for display or use at fairs or exhibitions. This avoids the need for the drawing up of any future instruments on temporary admission by creating a framework in which new categories of goods needing temporary admission facilities can be incorporated.
 Goods imported duty-free cannot remain indefinitely in the country of temporary importation. The period fixed for re-exportation is laid down in each Annex.
 The goods must be reexported in the same state. They must not undergo any change during their stay in the country of temporary importation, except normal depreciation due to the use made of them.
 Economic prohibitions or restrictions at importation are not applied since they generally relate to goods cleared for home use, thus serving as a national protection measure.

Recent developments 
In recent years the International Chamber of Commerce has been studying the possibility to digitize the ATA Carnet. A pilot project to test the digital ATA Carnet is currently undergoing. The first ever transaction on a digital carnet was processed on 20 October 2019 at Zurich Airport, Switzerland.

Administration 
In every country in the ATA Chain, a guaranteeing association (NGA) – approved by its respective Customs and the ICC World Chambers Federation – administers the operation of the ATA Carnet System. The role of a national guaranteeing associations is to guarantee to its Customs administration the payment of duties and taxes due when ATA Carnets have been misused on its territory (non-or late re-exportation of goods, for instance). The national guaranteeing organisation can also, with the prior consent of its Customs administration, authorise local chambers to deliver ATA Carnets on its behalf. In major trading nations, dozens of local chambers have that authority. Within ICC World Chambers Federation, a World ATA Carnet Council (WATAC) gathers the national guaranteeing organisations from all countries where the ATA Carnet is in force today. In short:

 Holders can use ATA Carnets as Customs declarations and guarantee
 National Customs authorities through which the goods are admitted into are allowed to claim Customs duties and taxes against NGAs within one year after the expiration of ATA Carnets
 National Guaranteeing Associations act as a chain to guarantee Customs duties/taxes plus 10% penalty
 The World Customs Organization (WCO) monitors the international Conventions that govern the ATA system.
 The International Chamber of Commerce (ICC), through its special department, the World Chambers Federation (WCF), organizes the internal procedures and administrates the members of the guarantee chain.

Member countries of the ATA Carnet guarantee scheme

Updated 31 May 2019

In the early 1960s, the ATA Carnet was in use in Ivory Coast, France, Yugoslavia, Switzerland and Czechoslovakia. In 1982 there were 36 countries.

Today, the ATA Carnet guarantee scheme is in force in 78 countries and territories.

Beside the 27 member states of the European Union and member states of the European Free Trade Association, the ATA Carnet is officially in force in Albania, Algeria, Andorra, Australia, Bahrain, Belarus, Bosnia and Herzegovina, Canada, Chile, China, Côte d'Ivoire, Hong Kong (China), Iceland, India, Indonesia, Iran, Israel, Japan, Kazakhstan, South Korea, Lebanon, Macau (China), Macedonia, Madagascar, Malaysia, Mauritius, Mexico, Moldova, Mongolia, Montenegro, Morocco, New Zealand, Pakistan, Russia, Qatar, Senegal, Serbia, Singapore, South Africa, Sri Lanka, Thailand, Tunisia, Turkey, Ukraine, United Arab Emirates, United Kingdom, the United States of America and Vietnam.

Brazil was a member country from 2016 up until 31 December 2021 when its NGA stepped down and no replacement was appointed.

List of National Guaranteeing Associations 
The following is a list of countries and their relative National Guaranteeing Associations. These countries officially issue ATA Carnets.

Field of application per country 
The table below is a list of countries which have signed the ATA Convention and/or the Istanbul Convention. The type of goods accepted depends on the eventual Conventions and Annexes they have signed. Some countries have signed either the ATA Convention or the Istanbul Convention but have yet to have a National Guaranteeing Association appointed and member of the ICC ATA Carnet Guarantee Chain to start officially issuing ATA Carnets. Also in some cases, despite not having signed a given Convention or Annex, the according type of goods will be accepted by some countries under their national law. China, for example, while not having signed Annex B6 regarding sporting equipment, will nonetheless accept temporary importation for these goods under its national laws.

Special application cases 
Due to bilateral, multilateral or subnational customs agreements, the following cases are possible:

 countries which accept ATA Carnets even without having signed any Convention (e.g. Monaco, Liechtenstein, San Marino, etc.);
 countries which delegate their power in areas covered by the convention to supranational entities (e.g. European Union Customs Union, Macau, China);
 territories which are part of a contracting party sovereign state but are not part of the same customs territory and are not accepting carnets (e.g. Greenland);
 territories which are part of a contracting party sovereign state but are not part of the same customs territory and accept carnets independently (e.g. Canary Islands, Faroe Islands, etc.);
ATA Carnets not being accepted or not necessary between contracting party sovereign states in view of a customs union agreement (e.g. Russia-Belarus, between member states of the European Union, etc.);
ATA Carnets having special conditions between contracting party sovereign states in view of a customs union agreement (e.g. Andorra-EU).

Carnet usage

The ATA Carnet allows the business traveller to use a single document for clearing certain categories of goods through customs in several countries without the deposit of import duties and taxes. The Carnet eliminates the need to purchase temporary import bonds. So long as the goods are re-exported within the allotted time frame, no duties or taxes are due. The main benefits can be summarised in:

 it simplifies customs clearance of goods in exporting and importing countries by replacing customs documents that would normally be required;
 it provides a financial security for customs charges potentially due on the goods that will be used in the countries visited;
 it helps to overcome language barriers and having to complete unfamiliar customs forms;

Failure to re-export all or some of the goods listed on the Carnet results in the payment of applicable duties and taxes. Failure to remit those duties results in a claim from the foreign customs service to the importer's home country.

ATA Carnet composition 
The ATA Carnet comprises a front and back cover within which are counterfoils and vouchers for each country to be visited or transited. The vouchers act as receipts for entry and re-export in foreign countries and are kept by foreign customs officials. The counterfoils are stamped by the foreign customs services and act as the carnet holders receipt. ATA Carnets are in A4 paper format.

 Covering pages
 These pages contains all information about goods, users, issuing data, guaranteeing associations and notes on the usage.
 They are kept in the Carnet at all times. 
 Counterfoils
 Counterfoils are used as evidences in case of duties and taxes are claimed in a later stage, it is therefore important to have the counterfoils properly stamped by Customs and kept properly in the Carnet. Based on colours, there are three types of counterfoils: exportation/re-importation (yellow), importation/re-exportation (white), transit (blue).
 Vouchers
 They are used as Customs declaration and guarantee, meaning they will be detached from the carnet and kept by Customs. There are five types of vouchers: yellow exportation voucher, yellow re-importation voucher, white importation voucher, white re-exportation voucher, and blue transit voucher. Each voucher is followed by the general list of goods.

Replacement and duplicate carnets 
A duplicate Carnet is issued to replace an existing Carnet in the case of the destruction, loss or theft. The validity of which expires on the same date as that of the one being replaced. Some countries also accept replacement carnets: a replacement Carnet is issued where it is expected that the temporary admission operation will exceed the period of validity of the one being replaced. A new validity date will be given to the replacement Carnet. When accepting the replacement, the Customs authorities concerned discharge the Carnet replaced.

Goods covered by the ATA Carnet 
ATA Carnets cover the usual and unusual: computers, repair tools, photographic and film equipment, musical instruments, industrial machinery, vehicles, jewellery, clothing, medical appliances, aircraft, race horses, art work, prehistoric relics, ballet costumes and rock group sound systems. ATA Carnets do not cover perishable or consumable items, or goods for processing or repair.

Most common uses include but not limited to:

 exhibitions and fairs
 professional equipment
 commercial samples and goods for testing purposes
 sports equipment
 goods for educational, scientific or cultural purposes

ATA Carnets may not be used for all purpose determined by the Istanbul (ATA and others) conventions in every member state of the ATA Carnet system, as they might not have acceded to the respective convention.

CPD China-Taiwan Carnet 

A system similar to the ATA Carnet System generally called Carnet de Passages en Douane China-Taiwan (CPD China-Taiwan) operates on the basis of bilateral agreements between Taiwan (under the name of Chinese Taipei) and a certain number of ATA countries including the EU member states, Australia, Canada, India, Israel, Japan, Korea, Malaysia, New Zealand, Norway, Singapore, South Africa, Switzerland and the United States of America (under the name of TECRO/AIT carnet). Other than a different colour code to distinguish it from the ATA Carnet, the conditions for its use, the goods for which it can be used, and customs procedures are identical. The CPD China-Taiwan Carnet is not to be confused with the also named CPD Carnet used to temporarily import motor vehicles into foreign countries.

See also 

 Carnet de Passages en Douane
 TIR Convention
 Certificate of origin
 Trade facilitation

References

External links
 ATA Carnet World Chambers Federation
The ATA System (ATA and Istanbul Conventions)
https://web.archive.org/web/20181110040600/http://carnet.roanoketrade.com/ Carnet provider

International trade documents
Customs duties
Export and import control
World Customs Organization
International trade law